Lexington Township is a township in Clark County, Kansas, USA.  As of the 2000 census, its population was 83.

Geography
According to the USGS, it contains one cemetery, Lexington.

The streams of Cat Creek, Fish Creek, Granger Creek and Lone Tree Creek run through this township.

References

External links
 US-Counties.com
 City-Data.com

Townships in Clark County, Kansas
Townships in Kansas